This is a list of sightings of alleged UFOs in Australia.

Pre 1900 
 In 1868, an alderman in Parramatta, New South Wales Frederick Birmingham spotted what he described as an ark, more appropriate for traversing the water, floating in the sky before landing in Parramatta Park.

1950s 

 22 January 1954, three people in Gawler, South Australia spotted a white UFO flying overhead followed shortly after by a RAAF jet.

1960s 

 19 January 1966, a farmer from Tully, Queensland reported seeing a large saucer shaped object, as well as a so-called "nest" of reeds in the swamp where the UFO was spotted.

 On 6 April 1966, many students and some staff at Westall High School in Clayton South, Victoria said they saw a UFO fly over their school, and then descend into a paddock.

1970s 
 The Valentich Disappearance occurred on 21 October 1978, when 20-year-old Frederick Valentich disappeared while piloting a small Cessna 182 aircraft over Bass Strait to King Island (Tasmania). Described as a "flying saucer enthusiast", Valentich informed Melbourne air traffic control he was being accompanied by an unknown aircraft.

1980s 
 On 21 January 1988 a family reported seeing a UFO while traveling across the Nullarbor Plain in South Australia. The family described the object as a "big glowing ball".

1990s
On 8 August 1993, Melbourne woman Kelly Cahill said she saw a large craft hovering over the road as she and her husband drove through the Dandenong Ranges near Belgrave, Victoria.

See also 
 Bass Strait Triangle
 List of major UFO sightings

References

Australia
Historical events in Australia